The Fast Lady is a 1962 British comedy film, directed by Ken Annakin. The screenplay was written by Henry Blyth and Jack Davies, based on the 1925 novel of the same name by Keble Howard. Don Sharp directed second unit.

"The Fast Lady" is the name of a vintage Bentley.

The film opened at the Odeon Marble Arch in London in December 1962. A loose sequel, Father Came Too!, was released in February 1964.

Plot
Murdoch Troon (Stanley Baxter) is a proud Scot living and working for a local government authority somewhere in south London. A shy young man, his main excitement comes from cycling. After he's forced off the road by an impatient car driver, he tracks down the owner, only to find that he is Commander Chingford (James Robertson Justice), the domineering and acerbic owner of a sports car distributorship.

Chingford reluctantly pays for the damage to Murdoch's cycle, but more significantly, Murdoch meets Claire (Julie Christie), Chingford's beautiful blonde daughter, and is smitten with her. She tells him she loves sports cars and would love to have one but "her great dictator" (meaning her father) won't allow it. Despite not being able to drive, Murdoch is talked into buying a car to impress her by his friend and fellow lodger, Freddie Fox (Leslie Phillips), a used car salesman and serial cad. Freddie sees a chance to ingratiate himself with Chingford and also to sell Murdoch a car. The car is a 1927 vintage Bentley 4½ Litre Red Label Speed model, painted in British Racing Green and named The Fast Lady.

Murdoch has his first driving lesson in a less exciting car, an Austin A40 Farina, which proves to be a comedy of disasters with a nervous instructor (Eric Barker). Freddie then makes a deal with Murdoch and offers to teach him, but the results are equally disastrous.

Unwilling to give up, and determined to prove his love for Claire, Murdoch bets her father that he can drive the car. An experienced racing driver, Chingford is convinced that Murdoch has no hope of achieving this — and bets him that he cannot. Murdoch takes Chingford for a drive in the Bentley and loses the bet. But the tables are turned when Chingford loses Murdoch's counter-bet that Chingford cannot drive back home in less than 30 minutes. He then reluctantly allows Claire to go out with Murdoch in the car.

The day comes for Murdoch's driving test. Freddie has set him up with a 'bent' examiner, but Murdoch draws the 'wrong' examiner. As the test comes to an end (and the examiner is almost certainly going to fail Murdoch), the car is commandeered by police to chase a Jaguar car driven by escaping bank robbers. The high speed chase takes them through town and country, across a golf course (leaving in its wake, a trail of disasters) and eventually the robbers are caught. The now furious examiner says that Murdoch not only fails but is "banned for life", but Chingford pooh-poohs this. Rather, he so admires Murdoch's driving skill that he will allow the couple to get engaged.

The film features cameos and performances by many well-known comedy and character actors, including Dick Emery as a car salesman, Clive Dunn, Gerald Campion, Frankie Howerd, Bernard Cribbins, Bill Fraser, 'Monsewer' Eddie Gray and Fred Emney. A racing sequence also features brief appearances by drivers John Surtees and Graham Hill, along with Raymond Baxter and celebrated automotive journalist John Bolster.

The Car
The Fast Lady is a 1927 Bentley 4.5-litre Red Label Speed model with Vanden Plas short chassis fabric body, registration number TU5987. It was sold by a specialist dealer in 2010.

Cast
 James Robertson Justice as Charles Chingford
 Leslie Phillips as Freddie Fox
 Stanley Baxter as Murdoch Troon
 Kathleen Harrison as Mrs Staggers
 Julie Christie as Claire Chingford
 Eric Barker as Wentworth, driving instructor
 Oliver Johnston as Bulmer
 Allan Cuthbertson as Bodley, driving examiner
 Heidi Erich as Grunhilde, one of Freddie's girlfriends (at the beach)
 Esma Cannon as Lady on Zebra Crossing
 Dick Emery as Shingler, Freddie's boss
 Deryck Guyler as Doctor Blake the police doctor
 Victor Brooks as Policeman
 Terence Alexander as Policeman on Motorcycle
 Trevor Reid as Examiner
 Frankie Howerd as Road Workman in Hole
 Bernard Cribbins as man on stretcher
 Clive Dunn as old man in burning house
 Bill Fraser as a golfer (uncredited)

Cameos by Graham Hill, John Surtees, Raymond Baxter and Dickie Davies in race scene in Murdoch's dream

Reception
It was one of the 12 most popular films at the British box office in 1963.

Critical
Variety wrote "A thin idea is pumped up into a reasonably brisk, amusing situation comedy, which is helped by a cast of experienced farceurs. In dialog, the pic is short on wit but there is enough slapstick fun."

DVD release 
The Fast Lady was issued on Region 2 DVD in the UK on 2 February 2004. A high definition restoration from the original film elements was released on DVD and Blu-ray by Network on 24 February 2020.

Notes

References

External links
The Fast Lady (1963) on BFI website

1962 films
British comedy films
1962 comedy films
Films directed by Ken Annakin
1960s English-language films
1960s British films